Banif Financial Group was a Portuguese international financial services group associated with Banco Internacional do Funchal. The company had a presence in Europe, South America, North America, Africa and Asia. In 2015, it was bailed-out by the Portuguese state and sold to Santander Group.

History
Banif was founded and incorporated by Horácio Roque on 15 January 1988 and took over all of the assets and liabilities of the defunct Caixa Económica do Funchal. In 1995, it opened offices in Caracas, Venezuela and South Africa; in 1996 in São Paulo, Brazil; and in 2008 in San Ġiljan, Malta.

In the wake of the Portuguese sovereign debt and banking crisis, Banif was one among a number of Portuguese banks which were nationalized in order to be rescued by the government. In December 2015, as part of a 2,2 billion euro bailout and restructuring, the Portuguese government sold the remainder of Banif's assets to Banco Santander Totta, the Portuguese subsidiary of Santander Group, for 150 million euros.

Subsidiaries

Banif consisted of the following subsidiaries, most of which have either been incorporated or purchased:

 SGM – Sociedade Gestora de Fundos de Pensões Mundial, S.A. (1989)
 Ascor Dealer – Sociedade Financeira de Corretagem, S.A. (1989)
 Mundileasing – Sociedade de Locação Financeira, S.A. (1990)
 Mundicre – Sociedade Financeira para Aquisições a Crédito, S.A. (1991)
 Banifundos – Sociedade Gestora de Fundos de Investimento Mobiliário, S.A. (1991)
 Invesfeiras – Investimentos Imobiliários, S.A. (1991)
 Banif – Investimentos – S.G.P.S., S.A. (1992)
 Banifólio – Sociedade Gestora de Patrimónios, S.A. (1992)
 Banif – Banco Internacional do Funchal (Cayman), Ltd. (1993)
 Açoreana Seguros (1996)
 Banco Comercial dos Açores (1996)
 BanifServ Agrupamento Complementar de Empresas de Serviços, Sistemas e Tecnologias de Informação (1997)
 Banif – Banco de Investimento, S.A. (2000)
 Banif Financial Services, Inc. (2001)
 Banif Mortgage Company (2002)

Stock exchange floats

Portuguese
In March 1992, Banif first appeared on the Lisbon and Porto stock exchanges.

North American
In 2002, Banif Securities acquired the Brazilian brokerage firm Indusval, giving them a place on the floor of the New York Stock Exchange.

References

External links

Defunct banks of Portugal
Banks established in 1988
Banks disestablished in 2015
2015 disestablishments in Portugal
Funchal
Portuguese companies established in 1988